Stratosonic Nuances is an album by American trumpeter Blue Mitchell released on the RCA label in 1975.

Reception
The Allmusic review awarded the album 2 stars stating "one might have expected great things. Unfortunately, the music is quite commercial (obviously recorded with potential record sales in mind) and is sunk by dull and instantly dated arrangements".

Track listing
 "Satin Soul" (Barry White) - 7:20  
 "Creepin'" (Stevie Wonder) - 12:01  
 "Bump It" (Blue Mitchell) - 4:53  
 "Nutty" (Thelonious Monk) - 8:56  
 "Melody for Thelma" (Mitchell) - 6:55

Personnel
Blue Mitchell - trumpet, flugelhorn
Ralph Jones - flute, tenor saxophone
Harold Land - tenor saxophone
Terry Harrington - baritone saxophone
Oscar Brashear - trumpet
Gale Robinson - French horn
George Bohanon - trombone
Mike Anthony, David T. Walker - guitar
Hampton Hawes - electric piano
Clarence McDonald - electric piano, clavinet, synthesizer, arranger 
Cedar Walton - electric piano, synthesizer
Tony Newton - electric bass
James Gadson - drums
Gary Coleman - percussion
Wade Marcus - arranger and conductor
Mike Lipskin - arranger

References

RCA Records albums
Blue Mitchell albums
1975 albums
Albums arranged by Wade Marcus